Francis Humphreys (28 July 1891 – 19 April 1961) was an Irish Fianna Fáil politician who served as a Teachta Dála (TD) for the Carlow–Kilkenny constituency from 1932 to 1933, 1937 to 1948, 1951 to 1954 and 1957 to 1961.

A medical practitioner before entering politics, Humphreys was elected to Dáil Éireann on his first attempt, at the 1932 general election for the Carlow–Kilkenny constituency. He lost his seat at the 1933 election, but in 1937, he was returned to the 9th Dáil as the last of four candidates to be elected in the new Carlow–Kildare constituency at the 1937 general  election.

Humphreys was re-elected at three further general elections, in 1938, 1943 and 1944. After further constituency changes he was defeated again at the 1948 general election in the restored Carlow–Kilkenny constituency. At the 1951 election, he was returned to the 14th Dáil, unseating the Labour Party's James Pattison. He lost again to Pattison at the 1954 election, before ousting Pattison again at the 1957 general election.

He died on 19 April 1961, before completing his seventh term in Dáil Éireann. No by-election was held for his seat in the 16th Dáil, which remained vacant until the 1961 general election on 4 October, when he was replaced by Labour's Séamus Pattison, son of his rival James Pattison.

References

1891 births
1961 deaths
Fianna Fáil TDs
Members of the 7th Dáil
Members of the 9th Dáil
Members of the 10th Dáil
Members of the 11th Dáil
Members of the 12th Dáil
Members of the 14th Dáil
Members of the 16th Dáil